In enzymology, an asparaginyl-tRNA synthase (glutamine-hydrolysing) is an enzyme that catalyzes the chemical reaction

ATP + aspartyl-tRNAAsn + L-glutamine  ADP + phosphate + asparaginyl-tRNAAsn + L-glutamate

The 3 substrates of this enzyme are ATP, aspartyl-tRNA(Asn), and L-glutamine, whereas its 4 products are ADP, phosphate, asparaginyl-tRNA(Asn), and L-glutamate.

This enzyme belongs to the family of ligases, specifically those forming carbon-nitrogen bonds carbon-nitrogen ligases with glutamine as amido-N-donor.  The systematic name of this enzyme class is aspartyl-tRNAAsn:L-glutamine amido-ligase (ADP-forming).   This enzyme participates in glutamate metabolism and alanine and aspartate metabolism.

References

 
 
 

EC 6.3.5
Enzymes of unknown structure